Eskimo is an album by American art rock group the Residents. The album was originally supposed to follow 1977's Fingerprince; however, due to many delays and arguments with management, it was not released until 1979.  Upon release it was hailed as the group's best record to date.

The pieces on Eskimo feature home-made instruments and chanting against backdrops of wind-like synthesizer noise and miscellaneous sound effects. The work is programmatic, each piece pairing music with text detailing a corresponding pseudo-ethnographic narrative. While Eskimo is officially maintained to be a true historical document of life in the Arctic, the stories are deliberately absurd fictions only loosely based in actual Inuit culture, and the chanting is a combination of gibberish and commercial slogans. The album satirizes ignorance toward and mistreatment of the indigenous peoples of the Americas.

Diskomo  

A companion piece, Diskomo, was released in 1980 as a 12-inch single, featuring a remix of the songs backed by a disco beat. In 1988, Diskomo was covered by Belgian new beat group L&O, and retitled "Even Now". Diskomo 2000, a follow-up EP featuring the original remix, its B-side (Goosebump, a collection of children's songs played on toy musical instruments), and several other versions, was released in 2000. The EP's title track, "Diskomo 2000" redoes Diskomo in the style of "Even Now".

Track listing

1987 CD bonus tracks 
Tracks 7-10 taken from the 1979 album Subterranean Modern. The album also featured the music of San Francisco bands Chrome, MX-80 Sound and Tuxedomoon.

2019 pREServed edition bonus tracks

Personnel
 The Residents – vocals, instruments, effects
 Snakefinger – guitar
 Chris Cutler – percussion
 Don Preston – synthesizers

References

The Residents albums
1979 albums
Ralph Records albums